Beck – De gesloten kamer (“Beck- the closed room”) is a Dutch-Belgian 1993 police film about Martin Beck, directed by Jacob Bijl. The film was shot in Antwerp.

Plot
Martin Beck investigates the case of a man shot dead in a room locked from the inside. Is it a suicide? If so, where's the gun?

Cast
Jan Decleir as Martin Beck
Els Dottermans as Monita
 as Waterman
 as Fisher
 as Roza Moreels
Josse De Pauw as Gilles
 as Ella
Mark van Eeghem 
Christian van Acker

External links

Belgian crime films
Dutch crime films
Martin Beck films
1990s Swedish films